Howling V: The Rebirth is a 1989 direct-to-video horror film directed by Neal Sundstrom from the screenplay by Freddie Rowe and Clive Turner, and filmed in Budapest, Hungary. Starring Philip Davis, Victoria Catlin, Elizabeth She, Ben Cole, and William Shockley, The Rebirth is the fifth entry in the series of seven stand-alone films with loose continuity.

Plot
In Budapest, 1489, a family living in a castle is slaughtered by a couple who then commit suicide. However, as the man lies dying, he discovers a baby survived the ordeal.

In 1989, a mysterious Count invites a group of people to the same castle's reopening. The group consists of Gail Cameron, Marylou Summers, Jonathan Hammet, David Price, the Professor, and Catherine. Other than them, the castle is attended by personnel Peter and Susan. During lunchtime, Hammet relates to Marylou Summers the story of the region which, 1,000 years before, was being terrorized by packs of wolves, supposedly being controlled by Satan himself, disguised as a man at day and as a wolf at night. According to the Professor, the castle was constructed around that time and then inexplicably abandoned. The Professor stumbles upon a dungeon while following some noises, just when something breaks its chains. He is then trapped inside and eventually attacked and killed.

The following morning, the Count explains to them the story of how the powerful family in charge of the castle was killed. He then expresses discomfort after the Professor is mentioned and abruptly leaves. He returns afterward to explain the Professor's disappearance. That night, Gail expresses to Ray her belief something is amiss and there is someone else in the castle. Unbelieving, Ray searches and eventually finds a secret passage, from which he witnesses Gail being attacked by a werewolf. He then finds an exit alongside the Professor's body but is then ambushed and killed in the snow. Peter sabotages David's camera. The Count searches for Cameron and Ray and finds the secret passage and a maze of tunnels alongside Jack and David. Everyone decides to organize a search party. Jonathan and Marylin discover someone tricked them into getting lost, and Jonathan is killed, Peter is harmed, and Marylou and Anna witness the werewolf attacking them.

Richard and Anna discover all of them lack a family and begin to suspect they were lured there. David and Catherine find most of the bodies. Convinced the Count is the killer, they go to alert the others, but they find Jonathan already dead. Pressured, the Count reveals all of them are descendants from the family who owned the castle and thus is a werewolf, which only can be destroyed by another relative. He used the others as bait. He is then locked in the dungeon, alongside Peter and Susan. David and Catherine decide to kill them against Anna's wishes, so she releases them, getting herself locked by them. She is supposed to be safe; however, she is killed by the werewolf when its human form approaches her.

David discovers Ray's body, while Catherine finds Anna's before being herself killed. Peter, after trying to kill David, accidentally kills Susan, who also tried to kill David, before being killed by Marylou. Going outside, they find the Count, who fights David over the gun after advising Marylou that David is possessed and will transform into the werewolf when the moon appears. Marylou retrieves the weapon and uses it to kill the Count, and afterward, she and David embrace, with David telling Marylou that there is no werewolf. Soon after, Marylou turned heel as the moon appears, smiling wickedly and revealing herself as the werewolf.

Cast
 Philip Davis as the Count
 Victoria Catlin as Dr. Catherine Peake
 Elizabeth Shé as Marylou Summers
 Ben Cole as David Gillespie
 William Shockley as Richard Hamilton
 Mark Sivertsen as Jonathan Lane
 Stephanie Faulkner as Gail Cameron
 Mary Stavin as Anna
 Clive Turner as Ray Price
 Nigel Triffitt as the Professor
 Jill Pearson as Eleanor
 József Madaras as Peter
 Renáta Szatler as Susan

Production
An international co-production film between The United Kingdom and Hungary. The film was written by Clive Turner and Freddie Rowe. Turner had previously written The Original Nightmare and would go on to write and direct New Moon Rising.  Cedric Sundstrom was originally asked to direct the film by Turner. He was unable to accept, as he was busy making a different film, but recommended his brother, Neal Sundstrom.

The film was shot in Hungary, its setting. Much of the crew was Hungarian, and the original cinematographer was fired after the first day of filming because he spoke virtually no English. Arledge Armenaki took over the role, despite only having a limited grasp of English himself at the time, but was able to communicate adequately well with Sundstrom, allowing filming to proceed.

Release
International Video Entertainment released the film direct to VHS in 1989 and released on DVD as a double feature with Howling VI: The Freaks in 2003 by Artisan Home Entertainment and in 2007 by Timeless Media Group. The film is now out of print and has not been re-released since.

Reception
Howling V: The Rebirth is almost universally regarded as one of the best "Howling" sequels. The "whodunit" mystery theme was singled out for praise, as well as the film's atmosphere. Screen Rant ranked the film number 3 on its list of the best films in The Howling franchise, saying: "There's less werewolf action in this than most "Howling" movies, but the mystery plot keeps things interesting and the final scene has a fun reveal". WhatCulture ranked the film as number 2: "After three sequels ranging from sub-par to absolutely disastrous, The Howling V: The Rebirth does the unthinkable and dares to be a really good, highly atmospheric horror tale", also claiming it to be "the shining jewel among the franchise's very questionable sequels".

References

External links
 
 
 

1989 films
1980s supernatural horror films
British supernatural horror films
British independent films
Direct-to-video horror films
Films based on horror novels
Films set in the 1480s
Films set in 1989
Films set in Budapest
Films shot in Budapest
Hungarian horror films
The Howling films
Direct-to-video sequel films
British werewolf films
1989 independent films
1980s English-language films
1980s British films